Charles Hill is a village in Ghanzi District of Botswana. It is located close to the Namibian border. Charles Hill is the second-largest village in Ghanzi District, with a population of 3,591 in 2011 census.

Charles Hill is the seat of the Charles Hill sub-District, established separately from Ghanzii District administratively in 2004. Although the limits of the sub-district have as yet to be clearly defined it generally is bordered to the north by the Trans-Kalahari Highway, the west by Namibia, to the east by Botswana Highway A2 and to the south by Kgalagadi District. The inhabitants are made up of a variety of different groups living side by side and in harmony with each other, they are:

 Herero
 Bakgalagadi
 Basarwa
 Batlharo (a tribe whose mother-tongue is Setswana)
 Coloureds
 Nama

Some of the developments in the village include a primary school, a junior secondary school, a hospital, a post office, some Rural Administration Centre offices which belong to the local government (known as  the council), pre-schools, hair salons and an Engen filling station which is   conveniently located next to the main tarred road from Ghanzi to Mamuno. An estimated 200 cattle posts lie within the sub-District but outside village limits.

Villages
There are eight villages and two settlements lying within the sub-District:

 Chobokwane
 Tsootsha (also known as Kalkfontein)
 Karakubis
 Kanagas
 New Xanagas
 Charles Hill
 Makunda
 Koke (also called Kuke)
 Ncojane
 Metsimantsho

References

r

Ghanzi District
Villages in Botswana